Nanohyla perparva is a diminutive species of frog in the family Microhylidae. It is endemic to Borneo and found in Kalimantan (Indonesia), Brunei, and Sabah and Sarawak (Malaysia). The nominal species includes distinct lineages that likely represent different species. Common names least narrow-mouthed frog and Labang forest rice frog have been proposed for this species.

Taxonomy 
N. perparva was formerly placed in the genus Microhyla, but a 2021 study using morphological and phylogenetic evidence moved nine species (including N. perparva) to a new genus, Nanohyla.

Description
Adult males measure  and adult females  in snout–vent length. The hands have only three fingers. The toe tips are expanded. Colouration consists of shades of brown above, with dark markings on the shoulders and a light band on the flanks.

The tadpoles are very delicate and mostly transparent but appear dark grey when viewed from above. The tail terminates in a flagellum.

Habitat and conservation
Nanohyla perparva occurs in primary lowland rainforests at elevations below . Adults live in the leaf litter and reproduce in both large and small rainwater pools. It can be very abundant after heavy rains when males congregate in water filled depressions and fight for females. The tadpoles are mid-water suspension feeders.

This species is threatened by clear-cutting and conversion of forests into oil palm plantations. It is present in a number of protected areas.

References

perparva
Endemic fauna of Borneo
Amphibians of Brunei
Amphibians of Malaysia
Amphibians of Indonesia
Amphibians described in 1979
Taxa named by Robert F. Inger
Taxonomy articles created by Polbot
Amphibians of Borneo